Private Games, written by James Patterson and Mark Sullivan, is the second book of the Private London series. The Private London series is itself a spin-off of the Private series. This book was first published on January 1, 2012 by Little, Brown and Company.

Plot
This book is a thriller novel set just before and during the 2012 London Olympics. Peter Knight is an investigator for Private London, a subsidiary of Private, a private investigative agency led by Jack Morgan in the United States. Private London has been commissioned to provide security for the London Olympics. Private London has been thrown into some disarray, because a number of its personnel were killed in an airplane crash just before the Olympics began.

Just before the Olympics begin, someone beheads Knight's mother's fiancé. The slain man is a member of the Olympic games organizing committee. After the murder, Karen Pope, a reporter for The Sun, receives a letter from a person who calls himself Cronus. Cronus claims he will kill persons involved with the Olympics who he considers corrupt. Cronus does just that, even infiltrating Olympics security and Knight's home. Throughout the novel, Cronus and his underlings kill those considered corrupt and anyone who gets in their way. Near the end of the book, Private Games takes an unexpected twist.

Reviews
A number of reader reviews for this book appear on at least four websites. All numbers are totals on the sites as of January 2013. On the Amazon.com website, 249 persons reviewed this book as of January 2013, giving it an overall rating of 3.5 out of five possible stars. On the Goodreads website, 598 reviewers for the same period gave Private Games a rating of 3.72 out of five stars. On the Barnes & Noble website, 345 reviewers gave a rating of 3.5 out of five stars. The Google.com website had a total of 236 reviews, who gave the book three out of five stars.

References

2012 American novels
Novels by James Patterson
Little, Brown and Company books
2012 Summer Olympics
Collaborative novels